Harry Wharfedale Tennant Garnett (16 September 1851 – 27 April 1928) was an English rugby union footballer who played in the 1870s, and rugby union administrator of the 1890s. He played at representative level for England, and Yorkshire (captain), and at club level for Bradford FC (captain), and Yorkshire Wanderers, as a forward, e.g. front row, lock, or back row. Prior to Tuesday 27 August 1895, Bradford FC was a rugby union club, it then became a rugby league club, and since 1907 it has been the association football (soccer) club Bradford Park Avenue.

Background
Harry Garnett was born in Otley, West Riding of Yorkshire, and he died aged 76 in Wharfedale, West Riding of Yorkshire.

Playing career

Harry Garnett refused to wear shin pads or stockings during matches.

International honours
Harry Garnett won a cap for England while at Bradford FC in 1877 against Scotland.

County honours
Harry Garnett won caps for Yorkshire while at Bradford FC.

Change of Code
When Bradford FC converted from the rugby union code to the rugby league code on Tuesday 27 August 1895, Harry Garnett would have been 43. Consequently, he would have probably been too old to have been both a rugby union and rugby league footballer for Bradford FC, and as he was an RFU official , it is very unlikely that he would have gone on to have Rugby League (Northern Union) affiliations.

Genealogical information 
Harry Garnett's marriage to Rebecca Mary Theresa (née Wardle) (born second ¼ 1859 in Leicester district – died fourth¼ 1924 in Wharfedale district) was registered during fourth ¼ 1880 in Strand district.
He is not related to former Yorkshire player Terry Garnett.

References

External links
Biography of Arthur Budd with an 1890–91 RFU Committee photograph including Harry Garnett
Search for "Garnett" at rugbyleagueproject.org (RL)
Photograph "Harry Wharfedale Tennant Garnett - Harry Wharfedale Tennant Garnett, Bradford Captain - Date: 01/01/1887" at rlhp.co.uk
Football; the Rugby union game

1851 births
1928 deaths
Bradford F.C. players
England international rugby union players
English rugby union players
People from Otley
Rugby union forwards
Rugby union players from Leeds
Rugby union officials
Yorkshire County RFU players
Yorkshire Wanderers players